Ed Saunders may refer to:

Ed Saunders, of The Saunders Brothers Show
Ed Saunders, character in Rawhide (1938 film)
Ed Saunders, character in Black Like Me (film)

See also
Edward Saunders (disambiguation)